The Army of the Peninsula or Magruder's Army was a Confederate army early in the American Civil War. 

In May 1861, Colonel John B. Magruder was assigned to command operations on the lower Virginia Peninsula with Yorktown as headquarters. The Confederate Secretary of War LeRoy Pope Walker ordered the Department of the Peninsula into existence on May 26, and the military force was named for the department. Magruder fought a portion of his command to good effect at Big Bethel, an early Confederate victory.

By year's end, the force had swollen to 13,000 men, still commanded by Magruder, now major general. In April 1862 Magruder's army was incorporated into the right wing of the larger army of Joseph E. Johnston, preparing defenses against an expected attack by George B. McClellan in what would become the Peninsula Campaign. While the army designation ceased to exist, Magruder's army's independence and initiative was instrumental in preventing McClellan from rapidly advancing on Richmond.

Notes

References
 Boatner, Mark Mayo, III. The Civil War Dictionary. New York: McKay, 1959; revised 1988. .

1861 establishments in Virginia
Military units and formations established in 1861
1862 disestablishments in Virginia
Peninsula
Virginia in the American Civil War
1865 disestablishments in Virginia
Military units and formations disestablished in 1865